The 1st constituency of Haute-Savoie is a French legislative constituency in Haute-Savoie.

Historic representation

Election results

2022

 
 
 
|-
| colspan="8" bgcolor="#E9E9E9"|
|-

2017

 
 
 
 
 
 
|-
| colspan="8" bgcolor="#E9E9E9"|
|-

2012

References

External links

1